is a former Japanese football player.

Club statistics

References

External links

1986 births
Living people
Association football people from Gifu Prefecture
Japanese footballers
J1 League players
J2 League players
Júbilo Iwata players
Ehime FC players
Association football midfielders